Morrisville–Stowe State Airport  is a public airport located two miles (3 km) southwest of the central business district of Morrisville, a village in Lamoille County, Vermont, United States. It is owned by the State of Vermont. The airport had scheduled passenger airline service via Air Vermont in the 1980s.

In April 2014, the airport closed for four months of improvements, including rebuilding the runway and lighting; it reopened on August 1, with private company Stowe Aviation operating the facility.  The improvements were funded by a $4 million federal grant from the Airport Improvement Project, and made up the first phase of Stowe Aviation's planned upgrades, with $20 million more in private investment to be used to build a new terminal building, maintenance facility, and other supporting infrastructure.

Commercial air service resumed in December 2015, when Tradewind Aviation begins service to Westchester County Airport in White Plains, New York.

Facilities and aircraft 

For the 12-month period ending April 30, 2005, the airport had 18,020 aircraft operations, an average of 49 per day: 96% general aviation, 3% military and 1% air taxi. There are 28 aircraft based at this airport: 64% single engine, 7% multi-engine and 29% gliders.

References

External links 
Morrisville–Stowe State Airport at Vermont Airport Directory

Airports in Vermont
Transportation buildings and structures in Lamoille County, Vermont